Juan Scassino (born 13 July 1953) is a Uruguayan boxer. He competed in the men's light middleweight event at the 1976 Summer Olympics.

References

External links
 

1953 births
Living people
Uruguayan male boxers
Olympic boxers of Uruguay
Boxers at the 1976 Summer Olympics
Place of birth missing (living people)
Light-middleweight boxers